In numerical analysis, Gauss–Jacobi quadrature (named after Carl Friedrich Gauss and Carl Gustav Jacob Jacobi) is a method of numerical quadrature based on Gaussian quadrature. Gauss–Jacobi quadrature can be used to approximate integrals of the form

The interval  can be replaced by any other interval by a linear transformation. Thus, Gauss–Jacobi quadrature can be used to approximate integrals with singularities at the end points. Similarly, the Chebyshev–Gauss quadrature of the first (second) kind arises when one takes . More generally, the special case  turns Jacobi polynomials into Gegenbauer polynomials, in which case the technique is sometimes called Gauss–Gegenbauer quadrature.

Gauss–Jacobi quadrature uses  as the weight function. The corresponding sequence of orthogonal polynomials consist of Jacobi polynomials. Thus, the Gauss–Jacobi quadrature rule on  points has the form

where  are the roots of the Jacobi polynomial of degree . The weights  are given by the formula

where Γ denotes the Gamma function and  the Jacobi polynomial of degree n.

The error term (difference between approximate and accurate value) is:

where .

References
 .

External links
 Jacobi rule - free software (Matlab, C++, and Fortran) to evaluate integrals by Gauss–Jacobi quadrature rules.
 Gegenbauer rule - free software (Matlab, C++, and Fortran) for Gauss–Gegenbauer quadrature

Numerical integration (quadrature)